The 1917 TCU Horned Frogs football team represented Texas Christian University (TCU) as a member of the Texas Intercollegiate Athletic Association (TIAA) during the 1917 college football season. Led by Milton Daniel in his second and final year as head coach, the Horned Frogs compiled an overall record of 8–2. The team's captain was Ralph Martin, who played halfback.

Schedule

References

TCU
TCU Horned Frogs football seasons
TCU Horned Frogs football